Vir is an island on the Croatian coast of the Adriatic Sea.

Vir or VIR may also refer to:

Places 
 United States Virgin Islands, ISO 3166-1 alpha-3 country code

Bosnia and Herzegovina
 Vir, Posušje

Iran
 Vir, Markazi
 Viyar, Zanjan

Montenegro
 Vir, Nikšić

Slovenia
 Vir, Domžale

Transport 
 Virgin Atlantic, a British airline
 Virginia International Raceway
 Virginia Water railway station, in England
 Virginia Airport in Durban, South Africa

Other uses 
 Virgo (constellation)
 Vir (crustacean), a genus of shrimps
 Vir Cotto, a character in the science fiction television series Babylon 5
 Queen Victoria
 Vertical interval reference, see NTSC
 Vulcanised Indian Rubber, a type of electrical cable

See also
Wir (disambiguation)